Julia Ann Moore (née Julia Ann Davis; December 1, 1847 – June 5, 1920) was an American poetaster. Like Scotland's William McGonagall, she is best known for writing notoriously bad poetry.

Biography 

Young Julia grew up on her family's Michigan farm, the eldest of four children. When she was ten, her mother became ill, and Julia assumed many of her mother's responsibilities. Her formal education was thereby limited. In her mid-teens, she started writing poetry and songs, mostly in response to the death of children she knew, but any newspaper account of disaster could inspire her.

At age 17, she married Frederick Franklin Moore, a farmer. Julia ran a small store and, over the years, bore ten children, of whom six survived to adulthood. She continued to write poetry and songs.

Moore's first book of verse, The Sentimental Song Book, was published in 1876 by C. M. Loomis of Grand Rapids, and quickly went into a second printing. A copy ended up in the hands of James F. Ryder, a Cleveland publisher, who republished it under the title The Sweet Singer of Michigan Salutes the Public. Ryder sent out numerous review copies to newspapers across the country, with a cover letter filled with low-key mock praise.

And so Moore received national attention. Following Ryder's lead, contemporary reviews were amusedly negative. The Rochester Democrat wrote of Sweet Singer that
 
Shakespeare, could he read it, would be glad that he was dead …. If Julia A. Moore would kindly deign to shed some of her poetry on our humble grave, we should be but too glad to go out and shoot ourselves tomorrow.  
The Hartford Daily Times said that
to meet such steady and unremitting demands on the lachrymal ducts one must be provided, as Sam Weller suspected Job Trotter was, 'with a main, as is allus let on.'…

The collection became a curious best-seller, though it is unclear whether this was due to public amusement with Moore's poetry or genuine appreciation of the admittedly "sentimental" character of her poems. It was, more or less, the last gasp of that school of obituary poetry that had been broadly popular in the U.S. throughout the mid-19th century.

Moore gave a reading and singing performance, with orchestral accompaniment, in 1877 at a Grand Rapids opera house. She somehow misinterpreted the jeering of the audience as criticism of the orchestra. Moore's second collection, A Few Choice Words to the Public, appeared in 1878, but found few buyers. Moore gave a second public performance in late 1878 at the same opera house. By then she had figured out that the praise directed to her was false and the jeering sincere. She began by admitting her poetry was "partly full of mistakes" and that "literary is a work very hard to do". After the poetry and the laughter and jeering in response was over, Moore ended the show by telling the audience: 
You have come here and paid twenty-five cents to see a fool; I receive seventy-five dollars, and see a whole houseful of fools.

Afterwards, her husband forbade her to publish any more poetry. Three more poems were eventually published, and she would write poems for friends. In 1880, she also published, in newspaper serialization, a short story, "Lost and Found", a strongly moralistic story about a drunkard, and a novella, "Sunshine and Shadow", a peculiar romance set in the American Revolution. The ending of "Sunshine and Shadow" was perhaps intended to be self-referential: the farmer facing foreclosure is gratefully rescued by his wife's publishing her secret cache of fiction.

According to some reports, though, her husband was not grateful, but embarrassed. Shamed or not, he moved the family 100 miles north to Manton in 1882. Moore's notoriety was known in Manton, but the locals respected her, and did not cooperate with the occasional reporter trying to revisit the past. They were a successful business couple, he with an orchard and sawmill, she with a store.

Her husband died in 1914. The next year, Julia republished "Sunshine and Shadow" in pamphlet form. She spent much of her widowhood "melancholy", sitting on her porch. She died quietly in 1920. The news of her death was widely reported, sometimes with a light touch.

Poetry
Some comparison to William McGonagall is worth making. Unlike McGonagall, Moore commanded a fairly wide variety of meters and forms, albeit like Emily Dickinson the majority of her verse is in the ballad meter. Like McGonagall, she held a maidenly bluestocking's allegiance to the Temperance movement, and frequently indited odes to the joys of sobriety. Most importantly, like McGonagall, she was drawn to themes of accident, disaster, and sudden death; as has been said of A. E. Housman's A Shropshire Lad, in her pages you can count the dead and wounded. Edgar Wilson Nye called her "worse than a Gatling gun". Here, she is inspired by the Great Chicago Fire:

Her less morbid side is on display when she hymns Temperance Reform Clubs:

Despite her acknowledgment that "Literary is a work very difficult to do," she did not approve of the life of Byron:

Influence 

Mark Twain was a self-described fan of Moore (though not for the reasons Moore would have liked). Twain alluded to her work in Following the Equator, and it is widely assumed that Moore served as a literary model for the character of Emmeline Grangerford in Adventures of Huckleberry Finn.

Grangerford's funereal ode to Stephen Dowling Botts:

is not far removed from Moore's poems on subjects like Little Libbie:

Moore was also the inspiration for comic poet Ogden Nash, as he acknowledged in his first book, and whose daughter reported that her work convinced Nash to become a "great bad poet" instead of a "bad good poet". The Oxford Companion to American Literature describes Nash as using Moore's

Selections of Moore appeared in D. B. Wyndham-Lewis and Charles Lee's Stuffed Owl anthology, and in other collections of bad poetry. Most of her poetry was reprinted in a 1928 edition, which can be found online. Her complete poetry and prose, with biography, notes, and references, can be found in the Riedlinger edited collection Mortal Refrains. Most poetry collections reprint the latest, "best", versions of their contents. Riedlinger has adopted the opposite philosophy.

Moore has been grouped into the Western Michigan School of Bad Versemakers. Her local contemporaries — including Dr. William Fuller, S.H. Ewell, J.B. Smiley, and Fred Yapple — do not appear to have had relationships with each other, but their proximity and similar penchant for exceptionally laughable verse have led to their posthumous grouping together.

Since 1994, the Flint Public Library has held the Julia A. Moore Poetry Festival to celebrate bad poetry.

See also

James McIntyre
Amanda McKittrick Ros
Obituary poetry

Notes

References
Wyndham-Lewis, D. B., and Lee, Charles (eds.): The Stuffed Owl: An Anthology of Verse N.Y. Review of Books (2003), reprint edition. 
Parsons, Nicholas. The Joy of Bad Verse London: Collins (1988). 
Petras, Ross: Very Bad Poetry Vintage (1997). 
Riedlinger, Thomas J. (ed.) Mortal Refrains: The Complete Collected Poetry, Prose, and Songs of Julia A. Moore, The Sweet Singer of Michigan Michigan State University Press (1998)

External links 
Julia A. Moore, the Sweet Singer of Michigan
Rockford Michigan Centennial Celebration Program (1939): Julia A. Moore, the Sweet Singer of Michigan
 
 

1847 births
1920 deaths
American women poets
People from Kent County, Michigan
Writers from Michigan
Poets from Michigan